Talorc son of Foith or son of Uuid (died 653) was a king of the Picts from 641 to 653.

The Pictish Chronicle king lists give him a reign of twelve years following his brother Bruide II. A third brother, Gartnait III, was king before Bruide.

His death is reported by the Annals of Ulster and the Annals of Tigernach. He was followed by  Talorgan son of Eanfrith.

References
 Anderson, Alan Orr, Early Sources of Scottish History A.D 500–1286, volume 1. Reprinted with corrections. Paul Watkins, Stamford, 1990.

External links
CELT: Corpus of Electronic Texts at University College Cork includes the Annals of Ulster, Tigernach, the Four Masters and Innisfallen, the Chronicon Scotorum, the Lebor Bretnach (which includes the Duan Albanach), Genealogies, and various Saints' Lives. Most are translated into English, or translations are in progress.
Pictish Chronicle

653 deaths
Pictish monarchs
7th-century Scottish monarchs
Year of birth unknown